Sarovaram is a 1993 Indian Malayalam-language film, directed by Jeassy and produced by K. M. Abraham, starring  Mammootty, Narendra Prasad , Jayasudha and Thilakan. The film was a commercial failure at the box office.

Plot 
Sarovaram tells the story of the life of a musician named Devadathan, played by Mammootty.

Cast 
 Mammootty as Devadathan
 Jayasudha as Rajalakshmi / Sony
 Thilakan as Vadasseriyil Neelakandan Namboothiri
 Narendra Prasad
 Shubha as Balamani
 Ashokan
 Mala Aravindan
 Janardhanan
 Rekha as Devu
 Geetha Vijayan as Jaya
 Ragini
 Zeenath
 Kuthiravattam Pappu as Cook
 Rizabawa as Old friend of Rajalakshmi

Soundtrack
"Moovanthipennine" - K. S. Chithra
"Ambilichangaathi (Female)" - K. S. Chithra
"Ambilichangaathi (Male)" - K. J. Yesudas
"Ohmkara Ganga Tharangam" - K. J. Yesudas
"Devamanohari Veendum" - K. J. Yesudas

References

External links
 

Films directed by Jeassy
1993 films
1990s Malayalam-language films
Films scored by S. P. Venkatesh